Peron's tree frog (Litoria peronii), also known as the emerald-spotted tree frog, emerald-speckled tree frog, laughing tree frog, and maniacal cackle frog, is species of tree frog in the subfamily Pelodryadinae. It is a common frog found in Australia.

Description and habitat
Peron's tree frog is one of the most variably coloured frogs in Australia, with the ability to change colour in less than one hour. They don't like to be handled for long periods of time. They also vary in shades of grey and brown, where their lightest is almost white. The frog has mottled yellow and black thighs, armpits, and groin. Occasionally, emerald spots are found on the back, which increase in number  with age. A characteristic uncommon in the genus Litoria is pupils which appear cross-shaped. This characteristic is only shared with Tyler's tree frog within the genus Litoria. The male Peron's tree frog is about 44–53 mm, while females are 46–65 mm.

These frogs prefer living in places full of climbing material, (stones and sticks), and may remain in water for long periods of time.

Ecology and behaviour

The call of Peron's tree frog is a high-pitched cackle, giving it the common names: the "laughing tree frog" and the "maniacal cackle frog". The frog is found in forests, woodlands, shrublands, and open areas, often far from a water source. They inhabit a variety of niches, predominantly  arboreal, such as tree hollows, cracks, and beneath flaking bark. The frog is commonly found near civilisation (such as suburban Sydney), using ponds as their breeding-water source. They can often be seen on windows or near lights at night, hunting the insects attracted to these light sources. They can often be found at dusk on houseboat windows and beneath street lamps along the Murray River in South Australia.

As a pet
In Australia, this animal may be kept in captivity/zoo with the appropriate permit.

References
 Jean-Marc Hero, Peter Robertson, John Clarke. 2004. Leptopelis peronii. 2006 IUCN Red List of Threatened Species. Retrieved 11 June 2015.

Article Road: List of All Frog Breeds: Things You Can Do to Ensure Your Frog Has a Long, Happy and Healthy Life: Peron's Tree Frog
Department of Environment, Climate Change and Water, New South Wales: Amphibian Keeper's Licence: Species Lists

External links

Litoria
Amphibians of Queensland
Amphibians of New South Wales
Amphibians of the Australian Capital Territory
Amphibians of Victoria (Australia)
Amphibians of South Australia
Amphibians described in 1838
Taxa named by Johann Jakob von Tschudi
Frogs of Australia